Bubenko is a surname. Notable people with the surname include: 

 Adalberts Bubenko (1910–1983), Latvian athlete 
 Janis Bubenko (1935–2022), Latvian born Swedish computer scientist
 Jozef Bubenko (born 1951), Slovak football coach

See also
 Babenko
 Butenko